Gormiti (Italian: Gormiti, che miti or Gormiti - Il ritorno dei Signori della Natura) is an animated series co-produced by Giochi Preziosi Group and Marathon Media, based on the Italian Gormiti toy line. It consisted of three seasons with 65 episodes. The first season, titled Gormiti: The Lords of Nature Return!,  aired on October 27, 2008. The second season, Gormiti: The Supreme Eclipse Era! aired on October 29, 2009, while the third season, Gormiti: The Neorganic Evolution, aired on October 30, 2010.

It was broadcast for the first time on Italia 1 and Canal J from 27 October 2008. It started on October 5, 2009 on Cartoon Network in the United States, and on CITV and Nicktoons in the United Kingdom. The second season returned to the USA and Canada in Summer 2012.

The series got good ratings worldwide and positive reviews. A new CGI series, titled Gormiti Nature Unleashed, began airing in Italy in 2012. A third series began airing in 2018.

Plot
The show follows two brothers, Nick and Toby, who discover that they have the power to transform into powerful creatures known as Gormitis. Their two friends Jessica and Lucas join the fight, and together they harness the power of the four elements. Now it's up to them to save their world, and many others, from destruction.

Characters
Toby Tripp
Nick's older brother and somewhat lazy. The lead protagonist and a popular character, a boy with blond hair, fair skin, and blue eyes. He would rather 'go Gormiti' than stay as a Keeper in the Primal Pad. He can become the Lord of Water and can control water from rivers and seas and can breathe underwater. In Curse of the Crown it's discovered that Toby's fear is spiders and in Going Buggy he is forced to face his fear head on to save his friends, allowing him in the end to conquer his fear of spiders (although he still gets startled by them). He loves playing football and playing tricks on his friends. Favorite attack - 'Aqua Blast'. Voiced by Emmanuel Garijo.

Nick Tripp
The co-protagonist of the series, a boy with brown hair, fair skin, brown eyes, wearing glasses and naturally is the nerd of the team. A counter to Toby, he is tidy by nature, worries about his studies and likes to observe proper manners and protocols on Earth and in Gorm. Can become disappointed when he can't be the Keeper in the Primal Pad (and guide his friends through the Gorm world), since he's the one who studies up on it the most. He is Toby's younger brother. Often at odds with Toby, differences are usually reconciled by the end of each episode. He is the Lord of the Earth, so he can control the rocks and stones. Favorite attack - 'Seismic Smash'. Voiced by Hervé Grull.

Lucas Wanson
A boy with brown hair, brown skin and green eyes that is a great lover of nature. He loves gardening school. He is the Lord of the Forest and can control the trees and plants. He has a disproportionate obsession with the environment and loves flowers, trees and birds. He is oblivious of Gina's feelings for him. Favorite attack - 'Jungle Attack'. Voiced by Alexandre Nguyen.

Jessica Herleins
The only girl in the group. Also blonde, fair skinned, and blue-eyed. She is optimistic and never afraid to face the Gormiti. Toby gets her mad sometimes. Along with Gina, who is her best friend, she sometimes can show a strong interest in shopping - Saying for instance that "you can never have enough shoes". Physically, she can show sporty abilities even when she is not transformed, scoring higher than Toby in Judo for example. She is the Ruler of the Air, so she can fly and control the winds. Although often engaged in fashion-related occurrences, she is always there for her friends and above all else when there are problems, does not hesitate to risk her life to save them. Favorite attack - 'Wind Attack'. Voiced by Delphine Braillon.

Razzle 
He is a small, sarcastic talking dinosaur/dragon who prefers to be called a terrible lizard that lives in the primal pad and acts as the kids' link between Earth and Gorm. When there is trouble in Gorm, he goes to find the kids and always risks being seen and/or startles the kids when he appears (and usually gets startled himself by their initial shock). He has a habit of running off when there is danger. Voiced by Christophe Lemoine.

Paula Pickney
A girl who appeared in a few episodes in the first season (she also made a cameo on the first episode of the third season), she always tries to catch Toby, Lucas, Nick and Jessica. She thought they were aliens (actually it was a joke that the boys had spread to get rid of her). In episode 25 "Slip Rift I" (which has more importance) a giant whirlwind carries Paula to Gorm, and finds out that Toby, Lucas, Nick and Jessica were the Lords of Nature and Razzle is a talking lizard. Did test shots with her camera and then showed them to her brother Ike, but, unfortunately for her, the photos had been deleted by Razzle and in the end she was unable to catch them. Voiced by Laura Préjean.

Ike Pickney
A classmate of Nick and Archaeology Club Component is always cracking jokes in bad taste and hates Toby for unknown reasons and usually tends to be his bodyguard. He is the older brother of Paula. He also appears only in the first season. Voiced by Tony Marot.

Gina Louren
She is the best friend of Jessica. Like Ike and Paula, she mostly appears in the first season. She is also obsessed with fashion, like Jessica and is always there when needed. She is in love with Lucas and has no problems showing it and is also the football team's mascot for the soccer team Toby and Nick are on. Voiced by Sylvie Jacob.

Episodes
<onlyinclude>

Season 1: The Lords of Nature (2009-09)

Season 2: The Supreme Eclipse Era! (2009-10)

Season 3: The Neorganic Evolution (2010-11)

Broadcast
It was broadcast for the first time on Italia 1 in Italy and Canal J in France from 27 October 2008. It started on October 5, 2009 on Cartoon Network in the United States, on Nickelodeon in the UK, and on Disney XD in Latin America in 2011. The second season returning to the USA and Canada in Summer 2012.

On January 3, 2011, Giochi Preziosi Group launched its animated series in Brazil, where the series is the number one show on TV Globinho. Gormiti has been well known among boys in Brazil, long before the television show appeared. There are already over 200 Gormiti licensed toys on the market in Brazil.

DVD
The first season was released on DVD by Clear Vision in March 2011, with the 2nd season being released on the 18 February 2013.

Video On-Demand
The first season of Gormiti is available for streaming via Toon Goggles On-Demand Entertainment for Kids.

All three seasons can also be located on HULU.

Video game
A Gormiti video game for the Nintendo DS and the Wii was developed by Climax Studios and released by Konami in August 2010 on Europe and September of the same year on North America.

References

External links
Il Mondo del Bambino | www.giochipreziosi.it Official corporate site of Giochi Preziosi, creators of Gormiti.

2009 Italian television series debuts
2000s French animated television series
2000s Italian television series
French children's animated action television series
French children's animated adventure television series
French children's animated comedy television series
French children's animated drama television series
French children's animated fantasy television series
Italian children's animated action television series
Italian children's animated adventure television series
Italian children's animated comedy television series
Italian children's animated fantasy television series
Anime-influenced Western animated television series
Animated television series about brothers
Television series about parallel universes
Television series by Banijay
Fiction about shapeshifting